Carlito Fermina (born 6 January 2000) is a Dutch-born Curaçaoan professional footballer who plays for the Alghero Calcio in Sardinia as a forward.

Club career
Fermina made his professional debut for Excelsior in a 1–1 Eredivisie tie with Fortuna Sittard on 11 August 2018.

Ahead of the 2019-20 season, Fermina moved to Almere City FC, starting on the U21 team, Jong Almere City.

Personal life
Born in the Netherlands, Fermina is of Curaçaoan descent.

References

External links
 

2000 births
Living people
Curaçao footballers
Footballers from Delft
Association football forwards
Dutch footballers
Dutch people of Curaçao descent
Excelsior Rotterdam players
Almere City FC players
Eredivisie players
Curaçao youth international footballers